Table tennis at the 2010 Asian Para Games were held in Asian Games Town Gymnasium from December 14 to December 19. There were 20 gold medals in this sport.

Medal summary

Medal table

Men's events

Women's events

Results

Men

Men's singles TT 1-3

Groups

Group A

Group B

Group C

Group D

Group E

Group F

Group G

Final Round

Men's singles TT 4

Groups

Group A

Group B

Group C

Group D

Final Round

Men's singles TT 5

Groups

Group A

Group B

Group C

Group D

Group E

Group F

Final Round

Men's singles TT 6-7

Groups

Group A

Group B

Group C

Group D

Group E

Group F

Final Round

Men's singles TT 8

Groups

Group A

Group B

Group C

Final Round

Men's singles TT 9

Groups

Group A

Group B

Group C

Group D

Group E

Group F

Final Round

Men's singles TT 10

Groups

Group A

Group B

Group C

Final Round

Men's Team TT 1-3

Groups
Group A

Group B

Group C

Final Round

Men's Team TT 4-5

Groups
Group A

Group B

Group C

Final Round

Men's Team TT 6-8

Men's Team TT 9-10

Women

Women's singles TT 1-3

Groups

Group A

Group B

Group C

Group D

Final Round

Women's singles TT 4

Groups

Group A

Group B

Group C

Group D

Final Round

Women's singles TT 5

Groups

Group A

Group B

Group C

Final Round

Women's singles TT 6-8

Groups

Group A

Group B

Final Round

Women's singles TT 9

Women's singles TT 10

Groups

Group A

Group B

Group C

Final Round

Women's Team TT 1-3

Women's Team TT 4-5

Women's Team TT 6-10

See also
 Asian Para Games - Table tennis

Asian Para Games
Asian Games
2010 Asian Para Games events
Table tennis competitions in China
2010 Asian Para Games
Table tennis at the Asian Para Games